In many-body theory, the term Green's function (or Green function) is sometimes used interchangeably with correlation function, but refers specifically to correlators of field operators or creation and annihilation operators.

The name comes from the Green's functions used to solve inhomogeneous differential equations, to which they are loosely related. (Specifically, only two-point 'Green's functions' in the case of a non-interacting system are Green's functions in the mathematical sense; the linear operator that they invert is the Hamiltonian operator, which in the non-interacting case is quadratic in the fields.)

Spatially uniform case

Basic definitions

We consider a many-body theory with field operator (annihilation operator written in the position basis) .

The Heisenberg operators can be written in terms of Schrödinger operators as

Similarly, for the imaginary-time operators,

[Note that the imaginary-time creation operator  is not the Hermitian conjugate of the annihilation operator .]

In real time, the -point Green function is defined by

where we have used a condensed notation in which  signifies  and  signifies . The operator  denotes time ordering, and indicates that the field operators that follow it are to be ordered so that their time arguments increase from right to left.

In imaginary time, the corresponding definition is

where  signifies .

Note regarding signs and normalization used in these definitions: The signs of the Green functions have been chosen so that Fourier transform of the two-point thermal Green function for a free particle is

and the retarded Green function is

where  is the Matsubara frequency.

(See below for details.)

Two-point functions

The Green function with a single pair of arguments is referred to as the two-point function, or propagator. In the presence of both spatial and temporal translational symmetry, it depends only on the difference of its arguments. Taking the Fourier transform with respect to both space and time gives

In real time, we will explicitly indicate the time-ordered function with a superscript T:

The real-time two-point Green function can be written in terms of 'retarded' and 'advanced' Green functions, which will turn out to have simpler analyticity properties. The retarded and advanced Green functions are defined by

and

respectively.

They are related to the time-ordered Green function by

where

is the Bose–Einstein or Fermi–Dirac distribution function.

Imaginary-time ordering and β-periodicity

The two-point Green function has the following properties. (The position or momentum arguments are suppressed in this section.)

Firstly, it depends only on the difference of the imaginary times:

Because of the small domain within which the function is defined, this means just

Time ordering is crucial for this property, which can be proved straightforwardly, using the cyclicity of the trace operation.

These two properties allow for the Fourier transform representation and its inverse,

Spectral representation
The propagators in real and imaginary time can both be related to the spectral density (or spectral weight), given by

where  refers to a (many-body) eigenstate of the grand-canonical Hamiltonian , with eigenvalue .

The imaginary-time propagator is then given by

and the retarded propagator by

As claimed above,  and  have simple analyticity properties: the former (latter) has all its poles and discontinuities in the lower (upper) half-plane. 

The thermal propagator  has all its poles and discontinuities on the imaginary  axis.

where  denotes the Cauchy principal part.
This gives

This furthermore implies that  obeys the following relationship between its real and imaginary parts:

where  denotes the principal value of the integral.

The spectral density obeys a sum rule,

which gives

Hilbert transform
The similarity of the spectral representations of the imaginary- and real-time Green functions allows us to define the function

and

Proof of spectral representation

We demonstrate the proof of the spectral representation of the propagator in the case of the thermal Green function, defined as

Inserting a complete set of eigenstates gives

Performing the Fourier transform then gives

Momentum conservation allows the final term to be written as (up to possible factors of the volume)

which confirms the expressions for the Green functions in the spectral representation.

The sum rule can be proved by considering the expectation value of the commutator,

and then inserting a complete set of eigenstates into both terms of the commutator:

Swapping the labels in the first term then gives

Non-interacting case
In the non-interacting case,  is an eigenstate with (grand-canonical) energy , where  is the single-particle dispersion relation measured with respect to the chemical potential. The spectral density therefore becomes

From the commutation relations,

with possible factors of the volume again. The sum, which involves the thermal average of the number operator, then gives simply , leaving

The imaginary-time propagator is thus

and the retarded propagator is

Zero-temperature limit

As , the spectral density becomes

where  corresponds to the ground state. Note that only the first (second) term contributes when  is positive (negative).

General case

Basic definitions

We can use 'field operators' as above, or creation and annihilation operators associated with other single-particle states, perhaps eigenstates of the (noninteracting) kinetic energy. We then use

This gives

Two-point functions

These depend only on the difference of their time arguments, so that

and

We can again define retarded and advanced functions in the obvious way; these are related to the time-ordered function in the same way as above.

Specifically,

and

Spectral representation

In this case,

The expressions for the Green functions are modified in the obvious ways:

and

Their analyticity properties are identical. The proof follows exactly the same steps, except that the two matrix elements are no longer complex conjugates.

Noninteracting case

If the particular single-particle states that are chosen are 'single-particle energy eigenstates', i.e.

then for  an eigenstate:

so is :

and so is :

We therefore have

We then rewrite

therefore

use

and the fact that the thermal average of the number operator gives the Bose–Einstein or Fermi–Dirac distribution function.

Finally, the spectral density simplifies to give

so that the thermal Green function is

and the retarded Green function is

Note that the noninteracting Green function is diagonal, but this will not be true in the interacting case.

See also
Fluctuation theorem
Green–Kubo relations
Linear response function
Lindblad equation
Propagator
Correlation function (quantum field theory)
Numerical analytic continuation

References

Books
Bonch-Bruevich V. L., Tyablikov S. V. (1962): The Green Function Method in Statistical Mechanics. North Holland Publishing Co.
Abrikosov, A. A., Gorkov, L. P. and Dzyaloshinski, I. E. (1963): Methods of Quantum Field Theory in Statistical Physics Englewood Cliffs: Prentice-Hall.
Negele, J. W. and Orland, H. (1988): Quantum Many-Particle Systems AddisonWesley.
Zubarev D. N., Morozov V., Ropke G. (1996): Statistical Mechanics of Nonequilibrium Processes: Basic Concepts, Kinetic Theory (Vol. 1). John Wiley & Sons. .
Mattuck Richard D. (1992), A Guide to Feynman Diagrams in the Many-Body Problem, Dover Publications, .

Papers
Bogolyubov N. N., Tyablikov S. V. Retarded and advanced Green functions in statistical physics, Soviet Physics Doklady, Vol. 4, p. 589 (1959).
Zubarev D. N., Double-time Green functions in statistical physics, Soviet Physics Uspekhi 3(3), 320–345 (1960).

External links
 Linear Response Functions in Eva Pavarini, Erik Koch, Dieter Vollhardt, and Alexander Lichtenstein (eds.): DMFT at 25: Infinite Dimensions, Verlag des Forschungszentrum Jülich, 2014 

Quantum field theory
Statistical mechanics
Mathematical physics